Melvin P. Bennett (born January 4, 1955) is a retired American professional basketball player.

He played forward for the Virginia Squires (1975–76) of the American Basketball Association and the Indiana Pacers (1976–78), Utah Jazz (1980–81) and Cleveland Cavaliers (1981–82) of the National Basketball Association. Born and raised in Pittsburgh, Pennsylvania, he played at Peabody High School and the University of Pittsburgh.

Currently, he works as an aide at Ocean City Intermediate School in Ocean City, New Jersey. There, he gives students snacks as prizes for answering his trivia questions. In 2015, he was voted by the students to dress like a turkey for Thanksgiving.

References

External links
Databasebasketball's entry on Mel Bennett

1955 births
Living people
20th-century African-American sportspeople
21st-century African-American people
African-American basketball players
American men's basketball players
Basketball players from Pittsburgh
Cleveland Cavaliers players
Hawaii Volcanos players
Indiana Pacers players
Pittsburgh Panthers men's basketball players
Power forwards (basketball)
Undrafted National Basketball Association players
Utah Jazz players
Virginia Squires draft picks
Virginia Squires players